Cochylidia multispinalis is a species of moth of the family Tortricidae. It is found in China (Anhui, Gansu, Guangdong, Guangxi, Guizhou, Hebei, Heilongjiang, Hunan, Sichuan).

The ground colour of the forewings is yellowish white, with a narrow brownish black stripe along the costal margin from the base to the median fascia. The hindwings are pale grey.

Etymology
The species name refers to the phallus having many spine-shaped cornuti and is derived from the Latin prefix multi- (meaning many) and spinalis (meaning spinate).

References

External links

Moths described in 2012
Endemic fauna of China
Cochylini